Edward William Clark (born November 30, 1946) is an American prelate of the Roman Catholic Church. He served as an auxiliary bishop of the Archdiocese of Los Angeles from 2001 to 2022.

Biography

Early life 
Edward Clark was born on November 30, 1946, in Minneapolis, Minnesota. Educated in California, he attended the former Our Lady Queen of Angels Seminary in Mission Hills, Los Angeles, and St. John's Seminary in Camarillo, California.

Priesthood 
Clark was ordained to the priesthood for the Archdiocese of Los Angeles by Archbishop Timothy Manning on May 9, 1972., He then served in pastoral assignments in the archdiocese. From 1985 to 1988, Clark studied at the Pontifical Gregorian University in Rome, where he earned a Doctor of Theology degree. He served as coordinator of religious instruction for secondary schools from 1988 to 1990, and was named president of St. John's Seminary College in 1994.

Auxiliary Bishop of Los Angeles 
On January 16, 2001, Clark was appointed auxiliary bishop of the Archdiocese of Los Angeles and titular bishop of Garðar by Pope John Paul II. He received his episcopal consecration on March 25, 2001, from Cardinal Roger Mahony, with Archbishops William Levada and Justin Rigali serving as co-consecrators. As an auxiliary bishop, Clark served as the regional bishop for the Our Lady of the Angels Pastoral Region.

Within the United States Conference of Catholic Bishops (USCCB), Clark has served as the Catholic co-chairman of the Anglican–Roman Catholic Theological Consultation and as a member of the Committee on Doctrine, the Committee on African American Catholics, and the Committee on Interfaith Activities.  Within the California Conference of Catholic Bishops, Clark served as chair of the Committee on Education, chair of the task force on Native American Historic Concerns, co-chair of the Serra Committee, and member of the Strategic Concerns Committee. Clark was also president of the Western Catholic Education Association, responsible for the accreditation of Catholic schools in seven western states.

Retirement 
Pope Francis accepted Clark's letter of resignation as auxiliary bishop of the Archdiocese of Los Angeles on February 15, 2022.

References

External links
Roman Catholic Archdiocese of Los Angeles Official Site

1946 births
Living people
Clergy from Minneapolis
21st-century American Roman Catholic titular bishops
Roman Catholic Archdiocese of Los Angeles
St. John's Seminary (California) alumni